Naby Damba (born 1 March 1993) is a Bissau-Guinean professional footballer who plays as a forward for SC Schiltigheim.

Career
Born in Guinea-Bissau, Damba began his footballing career with Sewe Sports of the Ivorian League. Afterwards, he signed for the CA Bastia reserve team and earned promotion to the first team in 2013, making six appearances in the 2013–14 Ligue 2, with three more the following season, before transferring to US Raon-l'Étape in 2015 along with defender Adnane Sahrane. At first, the forward intended to stay at CA Bastia but this was implausible because he did not have an agent at the time.

He has trialed for a club in Italy.

References

External links
 
 Subscriber content

Living people
1993 births
Bissau-Guinean sportsmen
Bissau-Guinean expatriate footballers
Sportspeople from Conakry
Association football forwards
CA Bastia players
US Raon-l'Étape players
Għajnsielem F.C. players
SC Schiltigheim players
Ligue 2 players
Championnat National 2 players
Championnat National 3 players
Bissau-Guinean expatriate sportspeople in France
Expatriate footballers in Ivory Coast
Expatriate footballers in France
Expatriate footballers in Malta
Bissau-Guinean footballers